Sophie McKinna (born 31 August 1994) is a British Olympic athlete specialising in the shot put. She won silver medals at the 2011 World Youth Championships and 2013 European Junior Championships. She became the 2019 British Indoor and Outdoor Champion.

Her indoor personal best is 18.82 metres (Birmingham 2022). At the 2019 World Championships in Doha she threw a new outdoor personal best of 18.61m to qualify for the final. By throwing over the 18.50m required she qualified for the Tokyo Olympics in 2020. She competed in the event, throwing 17.81m in the qualifying round to finish in 17th place.

In 2020 she became a double British champion when successfully defending her title and winning the shot put event at the 2020 British Athletics Championships with a throw of 17.88 metres.

She is the granddaughter of the former Norwich City footballer and manager Dave Stringer.  McKinna works for Norfolk Constabulary as a detention custody officer.

International competitions

References

External links
 
 
 
 
 
 
 
 
 
 

1994 births
Living people
English female shot putters
British female shot putters
Olympic athletes of Great Britain
Athletes (track and field) at the 2010 Summer Youth Olympics
Athletes (track and field) at the 2020 Summer Olympics
Commonwealth Games competitors for England
Athletes (track and field) at the 2014 Commonwealth Games
Athletes (track and field) at the 2018 Commonwealth Games
British Athletics Championships winners
Sportspeople from Great Yarmouth